Köçəsgər (also, Köçəskər, Kechasker, and Köçäsgär) is a village and municipality in the Agstafa Rayon of Azerbaijan.  It has a population of 5,223.

References 

Populated places in Aghstafa District